Liga Deportiva Universitaria de Quito's 1960 season was the club's 30th year of existence, the 7th year in professional football, and the 1st in the top level of professional football in Ecuador.

Squad

Competitions

Campeonato Profesional Interadino

Serie A

Results

References

RSSSF

External links
  

1960